Shiv Mahima is a 1992 Indian mythological movie produced by Gulshan Kumar under the banner of Super Cassettes Industries Ltd. It was directed by Shantilal Soni and written by Bhring Toopkari, and stars Arun Govil and Reshma Singh. The musics was composed by Arun Paudwal. The story is based on an ardent devotee of Lord Shiva who faces many difficulties in life but is saved by Lord Shiva every time.

Cast
Arun Govil as Shiv ji
Kiran Juneja as Parvati Mata
Gajendra Chauhan as Bhakt Shivdas
Reshma Singh
Kewal Shah as Somdev
Barkha Pandit
Gulshan Kumar as Bhaktraj

Songs

There were 11 Shiv Bhajans in the film, sung by Hariharan (singer) and Anuradha Paudwal. The music was composed by Arun Paudwal.

All Songs Videos:

https://www.youtube.com/watch?v=mBUu5lKwtJg&t=2409s

शिव महिमा, Shiv Mahima I Hindi Movie Songs I HARIHARAN, ANURADHA PAUDWAL

Movie Link:

https://www.youtube.com/watch?v=0ni7rBN_hTs

Shiv Mahima I Full Hindi Movie I GULSHAN KUMAR I ARUN GOVIL I KIRAN JUNEJA I T-Series Bhakti Sagar

References
3. शिव महिमा, Shiv Mahima I Hindi Movie Songs I HARIHARAN, ANURADHA PAUDWAL - https://www.youtube.com/watch?v=mBUu5lKwtJg&t=2409s

1992 films
T-Series (company) films
Hindu mythological films